Renaissance (also known as Paris 2054: Renaissance) is a 2006 animated tech noir film. The film, which was co-produced in France, the United Kingdom and Luxembourg, was directed by Christian Volckman. It was released on 15 March 2006 in France and 28 July 2006 in the UK by Pathé Distribution and on 22 September 2006 in the US by Miramax Films. In the English-language version, some of the main characters are voiced by Daniel Craig, Jonathan Pryce and Ian Holm. Renaissance uses a style of motion capture animation in which almost all images are exclusively black-and-white; only occasional colour is used for detail. The film concerns a French policeman investigating the kidnapping of a scientist who may hold the key to eternal life in a futuristic and slightly dystopian Paris.

The film received mixed reviews from critics and was a box office bomb, grossing only $1 million against a budget of $18 million.

Plot 
The film opens in a future Paris with scenes establishing the kidnapping of 22-year-old scientist Ilona Tasuiev, who works for the megacorporation Avalon. The focus transitions to police captain Barthélémy Karas, as he defuses a hostage situation by killing the hostage-takers. Afterwards Karas is given the job of solving the mystery surrounding Ilona's disappearance. Karas begins by contacting Dr. Jonas Muller, a former Avalon scientist familiar with her.

Muller had been working to cure progeria, a genetic condition which affected his brother. Muller worked for Avalon as their top scientist but left after he failed to find a cure and his brother died. He took up new work at a free clinic. Muller tells Karas that "No one ever leaves Avalon", throwing the corporation under suspicion. Karas visits Paul Dellenbach, one of Avalon's CEOs and questions him about Ilona. On suggesting he may have been sleeping with her, Dellenbach replies "I sleep with my wife, I sleep with my secretary, I even sleep with my sister-in-law but I would never sleep with one of my researchers".

After following a series of dead ends, control tells Karas they are tailing Illona's car through Paris. Eventually he captures the driver after a chase which ends at the Eiffel Tower. The man turns out to be a henchmen of Farfella, an Arab Muslim mobster and a childhood friend of Karas. The police captain returns the criminal to Farfella who in return gives him security footage of Illona's kidnapping; it shows her car being stolen by an incredibly old man.

Karas asks Ilona's sister, Bislane, who works for Avalon to break into the company's Archives to discover what Muller was researching. Bislane discovers that a Dr. Nakata worked with Muller in a quest to find a cure for progeria. But they destroyed all evidence of their work when some of the children they were testing on started to mutate. Karas and Bislane then escape because accessing the closed file has alerted Avalon security.

Later Karas opens up to Bislane and tells her that he and Farfella were raised in the casbah where they worked with gangs. After a drug run went wrong, they ended up in a holding cell. Farfella escaped but Karas was left to the mercy of the other gang. Karas puts Bislane under false arrest to protect her from Avalon. Meanwhile, Ilona is shown confined in a cyber ball which is being controlled by the old man.

Eventually Karas tracks down Muller. He explains that he took Ilona because through her research she has discovered the secret to eternal life (as he himself did 40 years ago); but knowing what the consequences would be if Avalon acquired such knowledge, he kidnapped her. Karas tries to encourage the old scientist to hand himself in but Muller is mistakenly shot by a police marksman. Karas then deduces that the mysterious old man is Muller's younger brother: now immortal but trapped in an elderly body.

Karas calls on Farfella who hides Bislane from Avalon while also getting a fake passport for Ilona. However the mega-corporation's security are also closing in on the Parisian sewer where Ilona is being held captive. After a short battle, Karas is mortally wounded rescuing Ilona. However she refuses to take the fake passport to start a new life. Instead she tells Karas she wants immortality by giving her discovery to Avalon. Reluctantly Karas shoots her in the back as she walks back towards Avalon security. CEO Dellenbach watches all this happen through a live feed from one of his men's helmet camera.

As Karas lies dying, he imagines himself apologising to Bislane for killing her sister, for which she forgives him. The film closes with Muller's little brother living as a tramp, throwing his picture of him and his brother into a burning bin. The final scene shows an advert for Avalon with an old woman becoming young again saying, "With Avalon, I know I'm beautiful and I'm going to stay that way."

Cast

French 
 Patrick Floersheim as Barthélémy Karas
 Laura Blanc as Bislane Tasuiev
 Virginie Mery as Ilona Tasuiev
 Gabriel Le Doze as Paul Dellenbach
 Marc Cassot as Jonas Muller
 Jerome Causse as Dmitri
 Bruno Choel as Pierre Amiel
 Marc Alfos as Nustrat Farfella
 Chris Bearne as Multiple
 Radica Jovicic as Woman Hostage

English dub 
 Daniel Craig as Barthélémy Karas
 Catherine McCormack as Bislane Tasuiev
 Romola Garai as Ilona Tasuiev
 Jonathan Pryce as Paul Dellenbach
 Ian Holm as Jonas Muller
 Rick Warden as Amiel
 Breffni McKenna as Dmitri
 Kevork Malikyan as Nusrat Farfella
 Pax Baldwin as Farfella Boy
 Lachele Carl as Nora
 Wayne Forrester as Administrator
 Julian Nest as Parisien
 Sean Pertwee as Montoya
 Jessica Reavis as Multiple
 Nina Sosanya as Reparez
 Leslie Woodhall as Elderly Man

Production 

The film's visual concept was based on film noir aesthetics, japanese animation as well other animated features like Sin City. The producers used motion capture and computer graphics to create the film's look. The cast performed their scenes in motion-capture suits in front of a blue screen. Computer animators translated these animations to digital models used for the characters. The animated characters were placed in three-dimensional computer backdrops, with post-process effects added to achieve the film's final look. French automaker Citroën designed a car specially for the film, imagining what a Citroën might look like in 2054. Volckman initially wanted Karas to drive a Citroën DS and approached the company for permission to use it in the film. Citroën suggested the filmmakers work with their designers to design a new car. The final design was produced after three months. The film cost €14 million to make over six years. It was funded by Disney with US$3 million provided from Miramax.

Reception

Box office 
The film grossed a total of $1,831,348 worldwide – $70,644 in North America and $1,760,704 in other territories – including $1,520,587 in Algeria, France, Monaco, Morocco and Tunisia.

Critical reception 
The film received mixed reviews from critics. The site's consensus reads, "Renaissance attempts to blend sci-fi wonder with stark noir animation, but is often more fun to look at than to watch." Metacritic reported the film had an average score of 57 out of 100, based on 17 reviews.

Renaissance won the Cristal for Best Feature at the 30th Annecy International Animation Film Festival.

The film was honoured at the 5th Festival of European Animated Feature Films and TV Specials where it was awarded the prize for Best Feature Film.

See also 

 List of animated feature-length films
 List of post-1960s films in black-and-white

References

External links 
 
 
 
 
 

2006 films
British black-and-white films
Animated thriller films
2006 computer-animated films
2006 animated films
French animated science fiction films
2000s French animated films
Luxembourgian animated science fiction films
British animated science fiction films
English-language French films
English-language Luxembourgian films
2000s French-language films
Rotoscoped films
2006 science fiction films
2000s dystopian films
French neo-noir films
Dystopian films
Cyberpunk films
Films about kidnapping
Films set in the 2050s
Films set in 2054
Films set in Paris
Films using motion capture
Miramax films
Miramax animated films
Method Animation films
Onyx Films films
Millimages films
LuxAnimation films
Pathé films
Odyssey Entertainment films
France 2 Cinéma films
Annecy Cristal for a Feature Film winners
Films about immortality
British adult animated films
French adult animated films
2000s American films
2000s British films